20thAnnie Awards
November 14, 1992

Best Feature Film: 
Beauty and the Beast

Best Television Program: 
The Simpsons

The 20th Annie Awards was the first Annie Awards ceremony which recognized the achievement of animation in film and television as a whole. For two decades, the awards ceremony only recognized individual achievement. The ceremony honored the outstanding accomplishments in animation in 1991.

Production Categories 
Winners are listed first, highlighted in boldface, and indicated with a double dagger.

Juried Awards 

Winsor McCay Award Recognition for career contributions to the art of animation
 Les Clark
 Stan Freberg
 David Hilberman

Outstanding Individual Achievement in the Field of Animation
 Glen Keane
 John Kricfalusi
 David Silverman

Certificate of Merit Recognition for service to the art, craft and industry of animation
 Robert Clampett Jr.
 David F. Crane
 George Feltenstein

References 

1992
1992 film awards
Annie
Annie